Brockton Point Lighthouse is located in Stanley Park, Vancouver, British Columbia. The light was first established at the location in 1890. A square tower, painted white with a red horizontal stripe, was built in 1914. The lighthouse was designed by  William P. Anderson and has a red lantern and an arched base with a walkway underneath. The light has been officially inactive since 2008 but may still be displayed occasionally for decorative purposes.

The site is owned by the Canadian Coast Guard and has been managed by the Vancouver Parks Board since 2006.

Gallery

See also
 List of lighthouses in British Columbia
 List of lighthouses in Canada

References

External links
 Aids to Navigation Canadian Coast Guard

Lighthouses completed in 1914
Lighthouses in British Columbia